Cirsonella naticoides is a species of very small sea snail, a marine gastropod mollusk or micromollusk in the family Skeneidae.

This species is a synonym of Cirsonella weldii (Tenison Woods, 1877).

Description
(Original description by Charles Hedley) The height of the shell attains 2.35 mm, its diameter 3 mm. This is a small, solid, cream-colored shell with a turbinate shape. The four rounded whorls contain no sculpture. The surface is smooth and polished, in contrast with most species in this genus which are cancellate. The umbilicus is deep and narrow, its margin a faint basal funicle. The aperture is entire circular, double-edged, on its right lower margin the low arched butt-end of the basal funicle, then a broad thick callus tongue. This is probably marking the termination of a second inner funicle, and reaching half-way across the umbilicus. Lastly there is a similar but smaller callus pad laid upon the preceding whorl. The double basal funicle is remarkable. The inner funicle is swallowed by the umbilicus and its presence is only indicated by the callus on the aperture. The outer funicle is unusually faint.

Distribution
This marine species is endemic to Australia. It occurs off Victoria and in the Bass Strait.

References

  Charles Hedley, The Mollusca of Mast Head Reef, Capricorn Group, Queensland. Part II; Proceedings of the Linnean Society of New South Wales v. 32 (1907)

External links
 Australian Faunal Directory: Cirsonella naticoides
 Cotton, B.C. 1959. South Australian Mollusca. Archaeogastropoda. Handbook of the Flora and Fauna of South Australia. Adelaide : South Australian Government Printer 449 pp.
 Iredale, T. & McMichael, D.F. 1962. A reference list of the marine Mollusca of New South Wales. Memoirs of the Australian Museum 11: 1-109

naticoides
Gastropods described in 1907